Alison Riske won the first edition of the tournament, defeating Belinda Bencic in the final, 6–3, 6–4.

Seeds

Draw

Finals

Top half

Bottom half

Qualifying

Seeds

Qualifiers

Draw

First qualifier

Second qualifier

Third qualifier

Fourth qualifier

References

External links
Main Draw
Qualifying Draw

Tianjin Open - Singles
Tianjin Open